De La Salle College, Orange was a Catholic boys' School located in Orange, New South Wales. It was located in Summer Street.

Patrician Brothers

The Patrician Brothers, an Irish order of Catholic teaching brothers, established a boys' school in Orange in 1890. Fourteen ex-students died in World War I.

The Patrician Brothers left Orange in 1927, when Bishop O'Farrell expelled the order from all schools in the Bathurst diocese following a dispute over syllabuses.

De La Salle Brothers

The De La Salle Brothers arrived in 1928 to take over the school. Additions to the Summer Street site opened in 1937 with glass bricks "incorporating the most modern ideas in natural lighting,"  and a handball court in 1939.

In 1977 the school was absorbed into the co-educational James Sheahan Catholic High School.

Notable alumni

James Franklin, philosopher and historian
John Ranch, Olympic rower
Jack Renshaw, premier of New South Wales (attended Patrician Brothers)

References 

Australia, Orange
Defunct Catholic schools in Australia
Defunct schools in New South Wales
Orange, New South Wales